What You See Is What You Get is the only studio album by the British singer and songwriter Glen Goldsmith, released in 1988 by RCA Records. It includes four songs which reached the UK Singles Chart: "I Won't Cry" (No. 34), "Dreaming" (No. 12), "What You See Is What You Get" (No. 33) and "Save a Little Bit" (No. 73). The album reached number 14 in the UK Albums Chart.

Track listing
All tracks written by Anna Jolley, Brian Harris and Mark Jolley, except where noted.

Tracks 11–14 on CD and cassette versions only.

Personnel
Credits adapted from the album's liner notes.

Musicians
Glen Goldsmith – vocals
Margo Buchanan – backing vocals
Jules Harrington – backing vocals
Brian Harris – drums, keyboards
Anna Jolley – backing vocals
Mark Jolley – drums, drum programming, programming, guitar, 
Ian Prince – keyboards
Mike Stevens – keyboards, guitar, saxophone
Zoot and the Roots – horn section

Production
Produced and mixed by Jolley Harris Jolley (Anna Jolley, Brian Harris and Mark Jolley)
Engineered by Steve Osborne, except track 1 by Mark Jolley; track 3 by Alan Moulder
Assistant engineer: Peter Lorimer
Design: SJH
Photography: Mike Owen

Charts and certifications

Weekly charts

Certifications

References

External links
What You See Is What You Get at Discogs

1988 debut albums
RCA Records albums